Jim O'Byrne (born 1941) is an Irish retired hurler. He played hurling with his local club Mount Sion and was a member of the Waterford senior inter-county team in the 1950s and 1960s.

References

1941 births
Living people
Mount Sion hurlers
Munster inter-provincial hurlers
Waterford inter-county hurlers